Irade may refer to:
 IRADe, Integrated Research for Action and Development, research institute based in New Delhi 
 Irade-i senniye, decree of the Turkish sultan.